The Argentina–Uruguay football rivalry (also known as Clásico del Río de la Plata) is a highly competitive sports rivalry that exists between the national football teams of the two countries, as well as their respective sets of fans. Games between the two teams, even those that are only friendly matches, are often marked by notable and sometimes controversial incidents. On 20 July 1902, both teams played the first international match outside the United Kingdom, with Argentina being the winner by 6–0.

This derby is the most played in football history, with 197 official matches to date. Argentina won 92, Uruguay 57, and 48 ended in a draw.

History

Background

Football had been introduced many years ago in both countries, being the first game played in Argentina on 20 June 1867, with the establishment of Buenos Aires Football Club, the first football club not only in Argentina but in South America. In Uruguay, football had been introduced in 1870. Argentina organised its first league championship, Primera División, in 1891 while Uruguay held its first domestic tournament, also named Primera División, in 1900.

Both countries considered themselves rivals due to their proximity. Moreover, the Argentine and Uruguayan Associations were the first in South America, organising together the first international competitions in the Río de la Plata, such as Tie Cup (1900) or Copa de Honor Cousenier (1905), played by champions of each associations.

First match

Although the first match ever recorded between Argentina and Uruguay was played on 16 May 1901, this is not considered an official game due to the match was not organized by Uruguay's Football Association but by Albion F.C. in its home field in Paso del Molino. The Uruguayan side had nine players from that club and the remainder from Nacional. Argentina won the match 3–2. 

In fact, the first official match was held in the same venue, on 20 July 1902, with Argentina beating Uruguay 6–0. The Argentina line-up was: José Buruca Laforia; William Leslie, Walter Buchanan; Eduardo Duggan, Ernesto Brown, Carlos J. Buchanan; Juan O. Anderson, Edward O. Morgan, Carlos Edgar Dickinson, Juan José Moore (cap.), Jorge Brown. Players were from Alumni (5 players), Quilmes (2), Belgrano AC (2), Lomas (1) and Barracas AC (1).

Uruguay line-up was Enrique Sanderson; Carlos Carve Urioste, Germán Arímalo; Miguel Nebel (cap.), Alberto Peixoto, Luis Carbone; Bolívar Céspedes, Gonzalo Rincón, Juan Sanderson, Ernesto Boutón Reyes, Carlos Céspedes. The squad was formed by eight players from Nacional and 3 from Albion. There were no players of CURCC in Uruguay due to the club refused to allow them to play. The goals were scored by Dickinson, Arímalo, Morgan, Carve Urioste, Anderson and J. Brown.

First competitions 
In 1905, the first edition of Copa Lipton was played between Argentina and Uruguay. The trophy had been donated by the Scottish tea magnate Thomas Lipton with the condition that the teams be made up of only native born players. The tournament was contested on an annual basis between 1905 and 1992. The decade of 1910 is considered "the golden age" of the competition, due to Argentina and Uruguay were the predominant teams in South America by then and the Copa Lipton was the most important competition for both sides, considering that CONMEBOL had not been established until 1916.

Other notable competition for both sides was the Copa Newton, first held in 1906 and continued on an annual basis until 1930. It has only been played sporadically since, with the last edition being contested in 1976.

Apart from Copa Lipton and Copa Newton, other two competitions were established, with the particularity of each one being hosted in each side of the Río del Plata. The Copa Premier Honor Argentino was held in Buenos Aires (it was played until 1920) while the Copa Premier Honor Uruguayo (1911-1924) was always held in Montevideo.

In 1910, the Copa Centenario Revolución de Mayo was played as part of the celebrations for the May Revolution in Argentina. The competition is notable for being the first international tournament of South America where more than two football nations participated. The "Copa Centenario" is also considered a predecessor to Copa América. Teams were Argentina (champion), Uruguay and Chile.

Because of having featured three of the subsequent four founding members of CONMEBOL, the Copa Centenario Revolución de Mayo was sometimes called "the first Copa América". However, CONMEBOL recognizes the 1916 South American Championship as the first edition of the competition.

Copa América 

With CONMEBOL established as the sport governing body in South America, the confederation organised its first competition in 1916, the first edition of the "Campeonato Sudamericano de Fútbol" (South-American Football Championship), now known as the "Copa América". It was held in Argentina to commemorate the centenary of the Declaration of Independence.

The first Copa América match between Argentina and Uruguay was played at Racing Club on 17 July 1916. The game finished 0–0. Uruguay was the winner of the first continental trophy.

Despite Argentina and Uruguay's large history in the most important competition of South America, they have never played a final match facing each other.

The "Olympic goal" 

In 1924, Argentina played a friendly match against Uruguay at Sportivo Barracas' stadium. When only 15 minutes had been played, winger Cesáreo Onzari scored from a corner kick, with no other player touching the ball before scoring. Due to the fact that Uruguay was the Olympic champion, this play was called "Gol Olímpico". This denomination still remains.

The goal stood since FIFA had previously regulated goals scored directly from the corner kick, as Onzari did during that match. According to La Nación newspaper, 52,000 fans attended the game, an Argentina 2–1 win, where the Uruguayan team left the field with only four minutes to play. Argentine players later complained about the rough play of the Uruguayans during the match, while their rivals also complained about the aggressiveness of local spectators, who threw bottles at them at the end of the match.

1928 Summer Olympics 

The 1928 Summer Olympics saw the first match of Argentina and Uruguay playing each other outside South America. In the final the Uruguayans played Argentina who had trounced Egypt, a team (Egypt) that would now fold like a house of cards; clearly out of their depth against more sophisticated opposition, conceding 6 goals to Argentina and as many as eleven to Italy in the Bronze medal match.

Argentina came to the final after thrashing United States 11–2, Belgium 6–3 and Egypt 6–0, while Uruguay had defeated The Netherlands, Germany and Italy in previous rounds. The interest was immense, with The Dutch having received 250,000 requests for tickets from all over Europe.

The first game (attended by 28,253 spectators) finished 1-1. The tie went to a replay. With the winning goal by Héctor Scarone, Uruguay won the replay match, also achieving their second consecutive gold medal, with 28,113 spectators in the stadium.

After the finals, players from both teams did not speak with each other. Tango singer Carlos Gardel invited Argentine and Uruguayan players to a show in the cabaret "El Garrón", in Paris. His efforts to achieve a reconciliation between both parts were not successful so Argentine and Uruguayan ended up in a fight during the show.

The World Cup  

In 1930 Uruguay organised the first FIFA World Cup. As two years before at the Summer Olympics, Argentina and Uruguay played the final, held in the Estadio Centenario in Montevideo. Argentina had previously defeated France, Mexico, Chile and the United States, while Uruguay beat Peru, Romania and Yugoslavia. Both teams thrashed United States and Yugoslavia for the same score (6–1) at the semifinals.

The final ended 4–2 to Uruguay after they trailed 2–1 at half-time, adding the title of World Cup winners to their status as Olympic champions. Jules Rimet, president of FIFA, presented the Uruguayan team with the World Cup Trophy, which was later named after him. The following day was declared a national holiday in Uruguay; in the Argentinian capital Buenos Aires a mob threw stones at the Uruguayan consulate.

The last living player from that final, Francisco Varallo (who played as a striker for Argentina), died on 30 August 2010 at the age of 100.

The second time Argentina and Uruguay met in a World Cup was in 1986, when Argentina beat Uruguay 1–0 at round of 16, with goal by Pedro Pasculli. The squad managed by Carlos Bilardo eliminated the Uruguayan side, advancing to the next stage. Argentina would then win their second world title when they beat West Germany 3–2 in the final.

Matches overview 
 Updated to December 2022

Eliminations 

 1928 Olympics Final : Uruguay 1 x 1 Argentina / Uruguay 2 x 1 Argentina (Agreggate: Uruguay 3 x 2 Argentina) - Uruguay Champion
 1930 World Cup Final: Uruguay 4 x 2 Argentina - Uruguay Champion
 1986 World Cup Round of 16: Argentina 1 x 0 Uruguay - Argentina Classified
 1987 Copa América Semifinal: Argentina 0 x 1 Uruguay - Uruguay Classified
 2011 Copa América Quarterfinal: Argentina 1 (4) x (5) 1 Uruguay - Uruguay Classified

List of matches 
The chart includes the complete list of matches played between both teams:

Notes

Unrecognised matches 

Notes

Titles overview

Official competitions 

Notes

Friendly competitions 
All the tournaments played between both countries exclusively:

Club 

At club level, Argentine and Uruguayan teams have had a strong rivalry, since the first international competition in Rio de la Plata, Tie Cup was held in 1900. Other competitions played by teams from both associations include Copa de Honor Cousenier (1905–20) and Copa Aldao, first held in 1913. Played (although irregularly) until 1955, Copa Aldao is seen today as the first stepping-stone into the creation of Copa Libertadores in 1960. Moreover, in 2015 a CONMEBOL's article described Aldao Cup as the first official international professional football cup in South America.

By the first years of football in Río de la Plata, some of the strongest teams in Argentina were Rosario A.C., Belgrano A.C. or Alumni, which played memorable matches against Uruguayan teams CURCC, Montevideo Wanderers and Nacional.

Argentine clubs have won the most titles in South America, with a total of 97 championships since 1900 to date. The most important competition in South America, Copa Libertadores, has been won by Argentine teams 24 times by seven different clubs, while Uruguayan clubs won the competition 8 times (with only Peñarol and Nacional as winning teams). The last title won by an Uruguayan club was the 1989 Copa Interamericana, when Nacional beat Hondurean Olimpia 5–1 on aggregate.

Club titles 
The table below compares titles won by Argentine and Uruguayan clubs since the first official international competition in 1905:

Finals between clubs in South American competition

Finals between clubs in Río de la Plata competitions 
AFA / AUF competitions often generalized as Copas Rioplatenses were official international competitions contested only by Argentine and Uruguayan clubs before the creation of official South American club competitions by CONMEBOL. Unofficial and unfinalized editions were excluded. 

The following is a list of all the matches played:

Notes

See also 
 Argentina–Uruguay relations

References 

 
International association football rivalries
Uruguay
Uruguay national football team rivalries
Argentina–Uruguay relations
Argentina at the 1930 FIFA World Cup
Uruguay at the 1930 FIFA World Cup
Argentina at the 1986 FIFA World Cup
Uruguay at the 1986 FIFA World Cup